Criminal is a 1994 Indian action thriller film directed by Mahesh Bhatt, starring Nagarjuna, Ramya Krishna and Manisha Koirala. Shot simultaneously in Telugu and Hindi languages, the film was produced by K. S. Rama Rao under the Creative Commercials banner in Telugu, and by Mukesh Bhatt under the Vishesh Films banner in Hindi with the music composed by M. M. Keeravani (credited as MM Kreem in Hindi). Criminal was inspired by the 1993 American film The Fugitive.

The Telugu version released on 14 October 1994, while the Hindi version released on 21 July 1995. Criminal was the last film of the Hindi film actor Ajit Khan.

Plot 
After witnessing the unfortunate death of a woman, who was unable to afford hospital treatment, Dr. Ajay Kumar cancels his planned immigration to the U.S. and instead sets out to develop a plan to open a hospital that will be accessible to people who cannot afford treatment in regular hospitals, called "Amma Hospital". This draws quite a lot of attention, and he becomes popular, especially with two young women, Dr. Swetha and ACP Ramya. He falls in love with Swetha, and both get married, breaking Ramya's heart in the process. Shortly thereafter, much to their delight, Swetha becomes pregnant.

When Swetha discovers a frightening organ-smuggling operation in her hospital while going through a friend's diagnostic report, she calls Ramya. Soon after, Swetha is attacked by a killer and rings the police. Ajay enters their home to find Swetha, who soon succumbs to her injuries. The police arrive to find her dead body and arrest Ajay for murder. They deduce that Ajay's motive for killing Swetha was money, as Swetha was a wealthy heiress. Furthermore, she shouted Ajay's name as she was on the phone with the police.  The court finds Ajay guilty, and he is sentenced to death. While being transported to the jail for the sentence to be carried out, the police bus meets with an accident as the other prisoners have staged a riot. Ajay escapes and changes his appearance. The police launch a manhunt for him but are unable to catch him. Ajay goes to Ramya's house to prove his innocence. Meanwhile, he used to know Ramya had a crush on him. Ajay catches the real killer and discovers the man behind everything - including the smuggling - was Ajay's friend Dr. Pratap. Finally, he reopens the hospital and puts garland on Swetha's picture. He and Ramya remain as friends.

Cast

Telugu version 

 Nagarjuna as Dr. Ajay Kumar
 Ramya Krishna as A. C. P. Ramya
 Manisha Koirala as Dr. Swetha Kumar
 Satyanarayana as Advocate Chandra Sekhar
 Kota Srinivasa Rao as Srinivasa Rao
 Nassar as S. P. Teja
 Sarath Babu as Dr. Pratap
 Sudha as Yasoda
 Gulshan Grover as Robert Rakesh Kumar
 Brahmanandam as Compounder Chitti Babu
 Dharmavarapu Subramanyam as Inspector
 Johnny Lever as himself
 Gundu Hanumantha Rao as Compounder Tinku
 Devadas Kanakala as Commissioner
 Kota Shankar Rao as Lawyer
 Garimalla Visweswara Rao as Servant
 Husain as Prisoner
 Jenny as Inspector Nanda Gopal
 Trishna as item number

Hindi version 
The lead cast and the characters portrayed by Grover, Nassar, Babu, Subramanyam, Kanakala, Visweswara Rao, Husain, and Jenny were retained from the Telugu version in the Hindi version. Trishna performed an item number in both versions.

 Nagarjuna as Dr. Ajay Kumar Varma
 Manisha Koirala as Dr. Shweta Varma
 Johnny Lever as Changu
 Laxmikant Berde as Mangu
 Ajit Khan as Jagdish Prasad
 Palav Vyas as Advocate
 Gurbachan
 Mukesh Pandey
 Zaheer  as Advocate Varma (Ajay's father)
 Beena as Ajay's mother

Soundtrack 
All the music is composed by M. M. Keeravani. The song "Paapki Paapki/Keemti Keemti" is inspired by Lonely Monday Morning from 12 Inches of Snow (1993) by the Canadian musician Snow. The track "Thelusa Manasa" (Only humming portion) was inspired from the English album Age of Loneliness performed by Carly. K. S. Chithra took 4 days to practice & replicate the same humming in her style, which almost became her trademark song from then. 
S P Balasubramaniam when heard the humming for the first time he thought it was sung by some western singer. Later when M. M. Keeravani told him that it has been sung by Chithra he was surprised and quoted "I can challenge that no other singer from India can sing this humming so perfectly as Chithra has sung."

Telugu Version

Hindi Version 

Hindi lyrics were written by Indeevar. Original audio was released on HMV audio. At first the tracks of "Tu Mile Dil Khile- All versions" were recorded in the voice of K. S. Chithra but due to some unforeseen reasons all the tracks sung by Chithra were replaced by Alka Yagnik, but still Keeravani managed to keep the humming portion sung by Chithra intact in all the tracks.

Release and reception 
Alluru Rahim of Zamin Ryot, reviewing the Telugu version of the film on 21 October 1994, described it as "the film which drives the audience out the theatres [sic]." While appreciating the Nagarjuna's performance and the soundtrack by Keeravani, Rahim opined that the film lacked good story and screenplay.

After the film's success, it was later dubbed and released in Tamil as Ellame En Kadhali. K. Vijayan reviewing the Tamil dubbed version for New Straits Times on 3 July 1995, opined that Bhatt had made a faithful remake of The Fugitive (1993).

References

External links 
 

1990s crime action films
1990s Hindi-language films
1990s multilingual films
1990s Telugu-language films
1995 action thriller films
1995 crime thriller films
1995 films
Films about amputees
Films about miscarriage of justice
Films directed by Mahesh Bhatt
Films scored by M. M. Keeravani
Films shot in Mumbai
Indian action thriller films
Indian crime action films
Indian crime thriller films
Indian films about revenge
Indian multilingual films
T-Series (company) films